Gary Edward Gentry (born October 6, 1946) is a former right-handed Major League Baseball pitcher.

Early years
Gentry was a second baseman at Camelback High School in Phoenix, Arizona, and only began pitching while at Phoenix Junior College. In 1966, he led the Bears to a national junior college championship. Shortly afterwards, he was drafted by the San Francisco Giants, but again chose not to sign.

After two years at Phoenix College, Gentry transferred to Arizona State University. He went 17–1 with a college record 229 strikeouts. In the 1967 NCAA University Division baseball tournament, Gentry tossed a fourteen inning gem against Stanford University to help his team catch the College World Series title. He was named the pitcher of the All-Tournament Team. Shortly afterwards, he was drafted by the New York Mets in the 1967 Major League Baseball draft. This time, he was ready to sign.

New York Mets
Gentry spent just two seasons in the Mets' farm system when he caught the eye of Mets manager Gil Hodges in Spring training , and earned a spot on the opening day roster behind Tom Seaver & Jerry Koosman in the starting rotation. He came within an out of a complete game in his major league debut, defeating the Montreal Expos in front of 8,608 at Shea Stadium.

Overall, Gentry made 35 starts, and went 13–12 with a 3.43 earned run average and 154 strikeouts his rookie season. Unquestionably, his biggest game came on September 24. The Mets, who once trailed the Chicago Cubs by 9 games on August 13, were now in first place by six games, and now regularly drew crowds over 50,000 to Shea. Gentry pitched a four-hit, 6–0 shutout against the St. Louis Cardinals to clinch the National League East title for the Mets.

On his 23rd birthday, Gentry was sent to the mound for game three of the 1969 National League Championship Series against the Atlanta Braves. Gentry lasted only into the third inning, however, the Mets were able to mount a comeback that would allow them to sweep the NLCS, and head into the World Series against the Baltimore Orioles.

With the 1969 World Series tied at one game apiece, Gentry faced Jim Palmer in game three. Tommie Agee led off the bottom of the first inning with a home run to give the Mets the early 1–0 lead (Agee also made two spectacular catches in center field to prevent the Orioles from scoring up to five runs in this game). Gentry, meanwhile, held the mighty Orioles scoreless, pitching into the seventh inning before handing the ball to Nolan Ryan for the save. He also helped his own cause in the second inning with a double that plated two runs.

Following a one-hit shutout of the Chicago Cubs on May 13, his record stood at 4–1 with a 1.71 ERA. He would cool off from there, and ended the season at 9–9 with a 3.68 ERA.

Following a  season in which Gentry went 12–11 with a 3.23 ERA, the California Angels inquired about Gentry, dangling third baseman Jim Fregosi as bait. Unwilling to part with Gentry, the Mets sent Nolan Ryan to the Angels in one of the most infamous trades in franchise history.

He would remain with the Mets for one more season, going 7–10 with a 4.01 ERA. Gentry was traded along with Danny Frisella from the Mets to the Atlanta Braves for Félix Millán and George Stone on November 1, .

Atlanta Braves
Gentry exited his June 5 start in the first inning due to right elbow soreness. He made his next start, but was pulled after the second inning, and placed on the disabled list. He returned a month later, but after just two more appearances, his season was ended for good.

After surgery to have bone chips removed from his elbow, Gentry returned to the mound on April 30, pitching an inning of relief. He made two more appearances before his season was once again cut short, this time for tendon surgery. He made seven appearances in  before the Braves decided to end their relationship with Gentry. He played his last game for the Braves on May 6, and was waived two days later.

Shortly afterwards, Gentry was re-signed by the Mets, but after just one appearance at Double-A Jackson was released on June 19.

Career stats

Gentry was an exceptional fielding pitcher. The only error he committed in his career (in 182 total chances) came on August 23, 1970, covering first on a ground ball by Pete Rose.

References

External links
, or The Ultimate Mets Database
SABR

1946 births
Living people
All-American college baseball players
Arizona State Sun Devils baseball players
Phoenix Bears baseball players
Baseball players from Phoenix, Arizona
New York Mets players
Atlanta Braves players
Williamsport Mets players
Jacksonville Suns players
Jackson Mets players
Major League Baseball pitchers
Florida Instructional League Mets players
National College Baseball Hall of Fame inductees